Kevin Ovenden (born 1968) is a British, left-wing, political activist who was a member of the Respect Party's leadership. He is an organiser of Viva Palestina.

Biography
Ovenden was for many years a leading member of the Socialist Workers Party.

He was expelled during the split between the leadership of the SWP and the activists organized around George Galloway.
He worked in the Westminster and Bethnal Green offices of then MP, George Galloway. It was arranged for him to speak at Socialism 2010, Chicago, 17 June 2010. He lives in Newham.

Gaza flotilla
Ovenden was on board the MV Mavi Marmara, part of the 2010 Gaza flotilla.
He was detained by Israeli forces and subsequently deported to Istanbul.

Works
Malcolm X: Socialism and Black Nationalism (Bookmarks, London, 1992)
Education: Why our children deserve better than New Labour (with Chanie Rosenberg) (1999)
"An Act Of State Terrorism", Counter Currents, Lee Sustar & Kevin Ovenden, 7 June 2010
Syriza: Inside the Labyrinth (with Paul Mason) (September 2015)

References

External links
"Kevin Ovenden Viva Palestina National Demonstration for Gaza Peace Flotilla End the Siege of Gaza", 05 06 10
R&R Interviews Viva Palestina's Kevin Ovenden - Breaking the Gaza Siege
ISRAEL: Gaza aid ship attack: interview with flotilla organiser Kevin Ovenden / London protests

1968 births
Living people
British activists
Respect Party officials